The 1971 Syracuse Orangemen football team represented Syracuse University during the 1971 NCAA University Division football season. The team was led by 23rd-year head coach Ben Schwartzwalder and played their home games at Archbold Stadium in Syracuse, New York. The team finished with a record of 5–5–1.

Schedule

Roster

First one-point safety
The first known occurrence of a one-point safety (conversion safety) was in an NCAA game on October 2, 1971, scored by Syracuse in the first quarter of a game at Indiana. On a point-after-touchdown kick, the ball was kicked almost straight up in the air. An Indiana player illegally batted the ball in the end zone (a spot foul defensive penalty). Syracuse won the game, 7-0. The 1970 rulebook (Rule 8-5-3) stated, "If a scrimmage kick fails to cross the neutral zone, or crosses the neutral zone and is first touched by Team B, or is untouched and then rebounds into the end zone where it is recovered by Team A, it is a safety," and (8-5-4) "If the penalty for a foul committed when the ball is free leaves the ball behind a goal line, it is a safety if behind the offender's goal line."

References

Syracuse
Syracuse Orange football seasons
Syracuse Orangemen football